World War I Memorial, located opposite to Gandhi Market, Tiruchirappalli in the state of Tamil Nadu, India, is war memorial dedicated for the soldiers of Trichinopoly.

History 

About 302 soldiers from Trichinopoly participated in World War I as a part of British Indian Army, of which 41 died during the course of war. In remembrance of those soldiers, the then government erected a memorial with a huge clock in it.

Maintenance 
The memorial which was also popularly known as "Clock Tower", was languishing without much maintenance. During the mean time, about 25 traders, including Burmese refugees, put up their shop and began to occupy the spaces around the memorial, which left unchecked became as hindrance in viewing and visiting the memorial. After many years of wait, on 27 February 2013 the city corporation decided to revamp the structure after persistent demands from Ex–servicemen personnels and other service organisation by cancel the licence and demolish the shops (excluding the ones run by Burmese refugees) and other structures around the memorial.

See also 
 India Gate

References 

Tiruchirappalli
Towers completed in 1919
Buildings and structures in Tiruchirappalli
Monuments and memorials in Tamil Nadu
Indian military memorials and cemeteries
History of Tiruchirappalli
Tourist attractions in Tiruchirappalli
20th-century architecture in India